Pequod is a fictional 19th-century Nantucket whaling ship that appears in the 1851 novel Moby-Dick by American author Herman Melville. Pequod and her crew, commanded by Captain Ahab, are central to the story, which, after the initial chapters, takes place almost entirely aboard the ship during a three-year whaling expedition in the Atlantic, Indian and South Pacific oceans. Most of the characters in the novel are part of Pequods crew.

Ishmael, the novel's narrator, encounters the ship after he arrives in Nantucket and learns of three ships that are about to leave on three-year cruises. Tasked by his new friend, the Polynesian harpooner Queequeg (or more precisely, Queequeg's idol-god, Yojo), to make the selection for them both, Ishmael, a self-described "green hand at whaling," goes to the Straight Wharf and chooses the Pequod.

Name 
Ishmael says that Pequod was named for the Algonquian-speaking Pequot tribe of Native Americans. Melville knew of the tribe's history, that it was decimated and scattered in the early 1600s by the Pequot War and by the epidemic that preceded it. The Mashantucket Pequot Tribe (Western Pequot tribe) and the Eastern Pequot Tribal Nation still inhabit their reservation in Connecticut.

Melville referred to the Pequot in other works, as well. Oshima Yukiko points to other symbolic references to the tribe in the novel and says that, in the final scene, Moby Dick's destruction of the Pequod reflects the destruction of the Pequot people. The name also evokes Biblical meanings.

Description
Pequod has endured the years and the elements, but not without sustaining damage. The ship has a quarterdeck and a forecastle and is three-masted like most Nantucket whalers of the time, but all three masts are replacements, taken on when the originals were lost in a typhoon off Japan.

Pequod is not unlike Ahab in this respect, since many of the rest of these missing elements have been replaced by the bones of the whales she hunts. She is not a new vessel, and with age would usually come some veneration and respect, which Ishmael tries to convey by using several historical references in his description of her. But in Pequods case this has been negated by the thick veneer of barbarity that has been overlaid onto the ship in the form of fantastic scrimshaw embellishment. Far from enjoying mere utilitarian replacements out of available whalebone, she has been ornately decorated, even to the whale teeth set into the railing that now resemble an open jaw. Like a fingerbone necklace on a cannibal, these adornments are clear evidence of Pequods success as a hunter and killer of whales.

The principal owners of the vessel are two well-to-do Quaker retired whaling captains, therefore "the other and more inconsiderable and scattered owners, left nearly the whole management of the ship's affairs to these two."

Peleg served as first mate under Ahab on Pequod before obtaining his own command, and is responsible for all her whalebone embellishments.

Symbolic significance 
Scholars have seen the Pequod and its crew as symbolic but have disagreed on the specifics. The ship's racial diversity of the crew is taken to reflect the ideal of the American racial community. Its thirty member crew equals the number of American states at the time, and, in the words of Andrew Delbanco, the Pequod "becomes a replica of the American ship of state." Some agree in seeing the ship as an "assemblage," that is a group that stands for a larger group, while others have challenged the "well-known" interpretation.

Cultural references 

 
 "PEQUOD" is an acronym for "Pacific Equatorial Ocean Dynamics" project

Citations

Notes

Sources

 
 
 
 
 
 Heflin, Wilson. (2004). 'Herman Melville's Whaling Years Edited by Mary K. Bercaw Edwards and Thomas Farel Heffernan. Nashville: Vanderbilt University Press.

External links  
 

Fictional elements introduced in 1851
Fictional ships
Moby-Dick
Whale collisions with ships